"Goodnight My Love" is a popular song written by George Motola and John Marascalco in 1956.

Background
The song was originally recorded by Jesse Belvin and released in 1956. John Marascalco produced the recording for Modern Records. Some sources claim that Barry White - who would have been 11 years old at the time - played piano on this recording.
However, in an interview in 1995 White denied this

Charts
The Jesse Belvin recording reached #7 on the US Billboard R&B chart in 1956.
The McGuire Sisters cover, also released in 1956, reached #32 on Billboard's pop chart.

The Paul Anka 1968 recording reached #27 on the Billboard singles chart in a 10-week chart run in 1969. The single peaked at #18 on the Record World chart and #13 in Canada.

Recorded versions
Amy Lee Feat. John Lee
Dee Dee Sharp 1963
The Honeys 1969 
Jerry Vale 1969
Jane Morgan 1969
El DeBarge
Paul Anka 1968
Paula Abdul 1992
Jesse Belvin 1956
Brook Benton 1968
Barry Biggs 1976   
James Brown
Alex Chilton 1999
Harry Connick, Jr. 2004
Tony Danza
Gloria Estefan 1994
The Fleetwoods, whose 1963 version reached #32 on the U.S. Pop chart.
The Four Seasons 1963
Art Garfunkel 1996
Jay and the Americans 1969
Screamin' Jay Hawkins
John Holt
Ben E. King 1965
Gladys Knight & the Pips
Los Lobos 1987
The McGuire Sisters 1956
Little Milton 1984
Aaron Neville 2012
Rocke-Pelle with Sigurd Jansen and his Rockin' Five. Recorded in Oslo on June 20, 1958. Released on the single Fontana 268 003 TF
Ray Peterson 1959
Lou Rawls 1990
Tavares 1977
The Tymes
Bobby Vinton 1963
The Vogues 1970
Barry White 1989

References

1956 songs
Songs written by John Marascalco
The McGuire Sisters songs
Barry White songs
Paul Anka songs
Paula Abdul songs
Brook Benton songs
Harry Connick Jr. songs
Gloria Estefan songs
The Fleetwoods songs
The Four Seasons (band) songs
Art Garfunkel songs
Jay and the Americans songs
Ben E. King songs
Gladys Knight & the Pips songs
Los Lobos songs
The Tymes songs
The Vogues songs
Songs written by George Motola
1956 singles
Modern Records singles